AJT may refer to:

Advanced jet trainer
American Journal of Transplantation
Association for Jewish Theatre
The Atlanta Jewish Times
AJ Tracey, a Grime MC
AJT (motorcycle), two bikes built by Arthur Tooze in Australia